Sina (Sientje) van Houten (23 December 1834 Groningen – 20 March 1909 The Hague) was the wife of Hendrik Willem Mesdag, the Dutch marine painter of the Hague School, and a painter herself.

Biography
She was the eldest of seven children of Derk van Houten and Barbara Elisabeth Meihuizen. One of her brothers was later Minister Samuel van Houten. Her father had a large sawmill on the Damsterdiep. She married Mesdag on 23 April 1856.

Sientje was a strong moral support to her husband, especially when she enthusiastically supported him in 1866, when he gave up his business profession solely for painting.  
She began to paint in 1871, after she lost her only child, the 8-year-old Klaas. Gerkens Arnaud helped her drawing, while her painting was aided by her husband and her cousin Lawrence Alma-Tadema. She specialized in landscapes and still lifes, but also painted portraits.

In 1874, together with Gerardina Jacoba van de Sande Bakhuyzen, Kate Bisschop-Swift and Margaretha Roosenboom, she painted "Hague orphans", a painting for the then Queen Sophie on the occasion of the 25-years royal jubilee of her husband, King Willem III.

In 1881 she took part in painting the Panorama Mesdag. As she worked, her husband painted her portrait, working on the panorama, and in the panorama itself she is portrayed sitting behind her easel.

In 1884, one of her landscapes won a gold medal in Amsterdam she received a bronze medal in Paris for a heath landscape. In Melbourne, her work also received a bronze medal. She exhibited her work at the Palace of Fine Arts at the 1893 World's Columbian Exposition in Chicago, Illinois. When Sientje Mesdag was 70 years, in 1905, she had an honorary exhibition in the halls of the Pulchri Studio.

Her work has been exhibited in numerous countries, including Australia, Belgium, England, France, Italy, Austria and the US. 
On 21 December 1904 she was named Officer in the Order of Oranje-Nassau. In 1906 the Mesdag-Van Houten couple celebrated their golden anniversary.
She died in the Hague, on 20 March 1909. She is buried in the Oud Eik en Duinen cemetery. He husband was also buried there in 1915. In 1930 her brother Samuel was laid in the same grave.

References

Gerharda Hermina Marius, translated by Alexander Teixeira de Mattos, "The Hague School: Sequel", Dutch Art in the Nineteenth Century, 1908
 Clara Erskine Clement Waters, "Supplement" Women in the Fine Arts, 1904

External links

 biographical notes on Sientje Mesdag van Houten, in Dutch RKD-Archive, The Hague
 free pictures of her paintings and drawings: on the website, Rijksmuseum Amsterdam

1834 births
1909 deaths
19th-century Dutch painters
Dutch women painters
Hague School
Painters from Groningen